Chris Turner (born July 25, 1973) is a Canadian journalist and author.

Biography
Turner was born in Moose Jaw, Saskatchewan, where his father, a fighter pilot, was stationed with the Canadian military. As a military brat, he lived in the Canadian North, the American Midwest, and Germany. He graduated from Queen's University, in Kingston, Ontario, in 1996 with an honours Bachelor of Arts in history. He also holds a journalism degree from Ryerson Polytechnic University, Toronto (1998). While at Ryerson, he completed an editorial internship at Shift magazine.

Following graduation from Ryerson, Turner reported on culture and technology for Shift from 1998 to 2003. His writing has also appeared in, The Walrus, The New Yorker, The Globe and Mail, The Independent, The Sunday Times, Time, The Guardian, Utne Reader, Adbusters and The South China Morning Post.  His latest work is How To Breathe Underwater (2014), a collection of his award-winning magazine writing from the last 15 years. He is currently working on a new book for Simon & Schuster with a working title of The Patch, which will be an analysis of the importance and history of the oilsands.

Turner was the recipient of a Fleck Fellowship at the Banff Centre in 2010. In 2009 he co-founded CivicCamp in Calgary. He was featured speaker for the Deakin Innovation Lectures in Melbourne, Australia, in 2008. He has given keynote addresses or lectures at thirteen university campuses, four literary festivals and approximately thirty major professional and industrial conferences nationwide. In 2013 Turner was the writer-in-residence at Berton House in Dawson City, Yukon.

Turner lives in Calgary, Alberta, with his wife, the photographer Ashley Bristowe, and two children.

Literary career
Turner's works include the bestselling Planet Simpson: How a Cartoon Masterpiece Documented an Era and Defined a Generation, published in 2004, and Geography of Hope: A Guided Tour of the World We Need, which was nominated for the Governor General's Literary Award and the National Business Book Award and was listed on the Globe and Mails 2007 "Globe 100" list of the best books of the year.

Turner's magazine writing has earned him nine Canadian National Magazine Awards, including the 2001 President's Medal for General Excellence (the highest honour in Canadian magazine writing).

Books
Books written by Turner include the following:
 How to Be a Climate Optimist: Blueprints for a Better World (Random House Canada, 2022)
 The Patch: The People, Pipelines and Politics of the Oilsands (Simon and Schuster, 2017)
 How to Breathe Underwater (Biblioasis, 2014)
 The War on Science  (Greystone Books, 2013)
 The Leap: How to Survive and Thrive in the Sustainable Economy  (Random House, 2011)
 The Best Canadian Essays 2010 (Tightrope Books, 2010; contributor)
 The Best Canadian Essays 2009 (Tightrope Books 2009; contributor)
 The Geography of Hope: A Tour of the World We Need (Random House, 2007)
 Planet Simpson: How a Cartoon Masterpiece Documented an Era and Defined a Generation (Random House 2004, revised ed. 2008)

Awards

The Leap was a finalist for the 2012 National Business Book Award and longlisted for the BC National Award for Canadian Nonfiction. The Geography of Hope was a finalist for the Governor General's Literary Award for Nonfiction, the National Business Book Award and the Alberta Literary Award for Nonfiction. 
Turner has received seven Canadian National Magazine Awards for his work in Shift, The Walrus and Alberta Views. His essay "Why Technology Is Failing Us (And How We Can Fix It)", won the 2001 President's Medal for General Excellence, the highest honour in Canadian magazine writing.

Electoral politics
Turner ran as the Green Party candidate for the Calgary Centre federal by-election held on November 26, 2012.

Notes

External links
Federal Election Campaign Page
Author Website: The Geography of Hope

1973 births
Living people
Canadian non-fiction writers
People from Moose Jaw
Writers from Saskatchewan
Queen's University at Kingston alumni
Toronto Metropolitan University alumni
Green Party of Canada candidates in byelections
Alberta candidates for Member of Parliament